Pilocrocis flavicorpus is a moth in the family Crambidae. It was described by George Hampson in 1917. It is found in Peru.

The wingspan is about 30 mm. The forewings are uniform red brown with a cupreous gloss.

References

Pilocrocis
Moths described in 1917
Moths of South America